Murray Geoffrey Davie (born 19 September 1956) is a former New Zealand rugby union and water polo player.

A rugby union prop, Davie represented Canterbury at a provincial level, and was a member of the New Zealand national side, the All Blacks, on the 1983 tour of Scotland and England. He played five matches for the All Blacks including one test match as a substitute. He was also a New Zealand international water polo representative.

Davie attended Burnside High School in Christchurch from 1969 to 1971.

References

1956 births
Living people
Sportspeople from Christchurch
Rugby union players from Christchurch
People educated at Burnside High School
New Zealand rugby union players
New Zealand international rugby union players
Canterbury rugby union players
Rugby union props
New Zealand male water polo players